The left atrioventricular orifice (left atrioventricular opening or mitral orifice) is placed below and to the left of the aortic orifice.

It is a little smaller than the corresponding aperture of the opposite side.

It is surrounded by a dense fibrous ring, covered by the lining membrane of the heart, and is reguarded as the bicuspid or mitral valve.

References

External links

Cardiac anatomy